Night of Error is a First-person narrative novel written by English author Desmond Bagley, and was first published in 1984. The manuscript was completed in 1962; however, Bagley desired to make revisions and never pursued publication. After his death in 1983, the work was completed using revisionary notes he had left behind, and was published posthumously by his widow.

Plot introduction
Mike Trevelyan, an English oceanographer, learns that his brother Mark, a marine biologist has died in suspicious circumstances while prospecting in the South Pacific. Although the two brothers were never very close, when an attempt is made to steal the few effects shipped back to the family, he decides to investigate.

The only clues - a notebook written in a code, and a lump of deep sea rock indicates that Mark may have stumbled onto a potentially lucrative deposit of manganese and cobalt - lead Mike to contact his father's old crew of ex-commandos, and with the backing of a Canadian tycoon to launch an expedition to investigate the death and to look for the rich mineral deposits the brother had apparently discovered.

The expedition soon faces both natural and unnatural disasters, as well as unexpected villains.

References

External links
Crime Time review of Desmond Bagley
 Fantastic Fiction site with publication history

1984 British novels
Novels by Desmond Bagley
Novels published posthumously
Novels set in Oceania
First-person narrative novels
William Collins, Sons books